The 1988–89 McNeese State Cowboys basketball team represented the McNeese State University during the 1988–89 NCAA Division I men's basketball season. The Cowboys, led by head coach Steve Welch, played their home games at Burton Coliseum and were members of the Southland Conference. They finished the season with a record of 16–14, 9–5 in Southland play. They won the 1989 Southland Conference men's basketball tournament to earn an automatic bid in the 1989 NCAA Division I men's basketball tournament as No. 16 seed in the Midwest region. They lost in the first round to No. 1 seed Illinois, 77–71.

Roster

Schedule and results
 
|-
!colspan=9 style=| Regular season

|-
!colspan=9 style=| Southland tournament

|-
!colspan=9 style=| NCAA tournament

References

McNeese State
McNeese State
McNeese State Cowboys basketball team
McNeese State Cowboys basketball team
McNeese Cowboys basketball seasons